"Hypnotize Me" is a song by Nigerian recording artist, Olu Maintain featuring Grammy Award-winning artists 50 Cent and Olivia. It was officially released on January 4, 2012, as the second track from his debut album, Chosen One.
The song was recorded in Nigeria and produced by Tayo Adeyemi, a Nigerian music director that directed "Yahooze".

Release history

References

Olu Maintain songs
2014 singles